In the theory of dynamical systems, Peixoto theorem, proved by Maurício Peixoto, states that among all smooth flows on surfaces, i.e. compact two-dimensional manifolds, structurally stable systems may be characterized by the following properties:

 The set of non-wandering points consists only of periodic orbits and fixed points.
 The set of fixed points is finite and consists only of hyperbolic equilibrium points.
 Finiteness of attracting or repelling periodic orbits.
 Absence of saddle-to-saddle connections.

Moreover, they form an open set in the space of all flows endowed with C1 topology.

See also 

 Andronov–Pontryagin criterion

References 

 Jacob Palis, W. de Melo, Geometric Theory of Dynamical Systems. Springer-Verlag, 1982

Stability theory
Theorems in dynamical systems